Jürgen Macho (born 24 August 1977) is an Austrian retired football goalkeeper. He is the goalkeeper coach of Rapid Wien.

Club career
Macho started his first-team career with Wiener Sport-Club in 1996, and moved after one season to First Vienna FC, where he spent three seasons before leaving for Premier League club Sunderland in 2000.

At Sunderland, Macho spent three seasons as the second-choice keeper, behind Danish international Thomas Sørensen, and managed a total of 22 league appearances. He then transferred to Chelsea for the 2003–04 season, but was mostly fourth-choice there. He suffered a serious season-long injury, and subsequently failed to make a single competitive appearance with the team.

In August 2004, having been released from the remaining year of his Chelsea contract, Macho left the club to join Austrian Bundesliga side SK Rapid Wien, on what was scheduled to be a year-long loan deal. However, he spent just four months there, managing eight league appearances, as well as two in the UEFA Cup.

In January 2005, Macho joined Germany's 1. FC Kaiserslautern, where he first spent six months as the third-choice, behind Tim Wiese and Thomas Ernst. However, he managed to become the starter in 2005–06, as Wiese left for SV Werder Bremen. He subsequently made a total of 20 league appearances that season, but missed nearly the entire second part of the season due to an injury. He continued to be Kaiserslautern's main goalkeeper during 2006–07, with the team now in the second division, to where it was relegated after finishing 16th in the topflight the previous season.

On 31 August 2007, Macho joined AEK Athens F.C. in Greece. He was soon selected as the team's first-choice goalkeeper, ahead of Brazilian Marcelo Moretto. On 26 March 2009, it was announced he would be released from contract after it expired in June.

Macho was in training with Premier League's Wigan Athletic in view to a permanent move, but the transfer was cancelled on 29 September 2009.

On 5 November 2009, after a few months without a club, Macho returned to his country after five years, signing with LASK Linz. At the end of the season, however, he moved to Greece again, joining Panionios GSS.

International career
Macho made his debut for Austria in 2002, going on to amass 26 internationals, including two 2006 FIFA World Cup qualifiers in October 2005.

On 16 November 2007, in a friendly against England, he swallowed his tongue after a collision with Peter Crouch. His life was saved by Austria's chief medic. In UEFA Euro 2008, Macho played all three group stage matches for the hosts, in an eventual group stage exit.

Honours
Rapid Wien:
Austrian League: 2004–05

References

External links

Rapid Wien archives 

Jürgen Macho at Footballdatabase

1977 births
Living people
Footballers from Vienna
Austrian footballers
Association football goalkeepers
Austrian Football Bundesliga players
First Vienna FC players
SK Rapid Wien players
LASK players
Premier League players
Sunderland A.F.C. players
Chelsea F.C. players
Bundesliga players
2. Bundesliga players
1. FC Kaiserslautern players
Super League Greece players
AEK Athens F.C. players
Panionios F.C. players
FC Admira Wacker Mödling players
Austria international footballers
UEFA Euro 2008 players
Austrian expatriate footballers
Expatriate footballers in England
Expatriate footballers in Germany
Expatriate footballers in Greece
Wiener Sport-Club players
Austrian expatriate sportspeople in England
Austrian expatriate sportspeople in Greece
Austrian expatriate sportspeople in Germany